"Love Is the Groove" is the first single by the singer/songwriter Betsy Cook. Released in 1991 by East West Records, it was the first track to be taken from her debut album The Girl Who Ate Herself (1992).

Track listings
7" single (YZ621) and Cassingle (YZ621C):
"Love Is the Groove" (4:40)
"Diving" (5:35)

12" single (YZ621T):
"Love Is the Groove" (Heavens To Betsy mix) (7:17)
"Love Is the Groove" (Funky Phantom mix) (6:41)
"Love Is the Groove" (7" mix) (4:40)
"Love Is the Groove" (Cookie Monster mix) (6:33)

CD single (YZ621CD):
"Love Is the Groove" (7" mix) (4:40)
"Love Is the Groove" (Heavens To Betsy mix) (7:17)
"Love Is the Groove" (Funky Phantom mix) (6:41)
"Diving" (5:35)

Cher cover
The song was covered by American singer-actress Cher for her Grammy-winning 1998 album Believe.  Cher's version featured similar, yet more updated techno-sounding instrumentation and slightly altered lyrics.

1991 singles
1991 songs
Cher songs
Songs written by Bruce Woolley
East West Records singles
Songs written by Betsy Cook